Nototriche is a genus of flowering plant in the family Malvaceae. They generally grow at high altitude in the Andes region of South America.

Species
There are over 100 species in the genus Nototriche, which include:
 Nototriche ecuadoriensis
 Nototriche jamesonii

Cultivation
Many species are extremely attractive as ornamental plants in alpine gardens, but very difficult to grow in cultivation. The UK Alpine Garden Society gives some details of the difficulties of cultivating these plants.

References

Malveae
Alpine flora
Malvaceae genera
Taxonomy articles created by Polbot
Taxa named by Nikolai Turczaninow